Erebato River is a river of Venezuela, tributary of the Caura River. It is part of the Orinoco River basin.

See also
List of rivers of Venezuela

References
Rand McNally, The New International Atlas, 1993.

Rivers of Venezuela